A dual-purpose improved conventional munition (DPICM) is an artillery or surface-to-surface missile warhead designed to burst into submunitions at an optimum altitude and distance from the desired target for dense area coverage. The submunitions use both shaped charges for the anti-armor role, and fragmentation for the antipersonnel role, hence the nomenclature "dual-purpose".  Some submunitions may be designed for delayed reaction or mobility denial (mines). The air-to-surface variety of this kind of munition is better known as a cluster bomb. They are banned by more than 100 countries under the Convention on Cluster Munitions.

United States DPICM projectiles

Development work for DPICM projectiles began in the late 1950s, with the first projectile, the 105 mm M444 entering service in 1961. Its submunitions were simple bounding anti-personnel grenades (ICM). Production of the M444 ended in the early 1990s.

The first true DPICM was the 155 mm M483, produced in the 1970s. By 1975, an improved version, the M483A1, was being used. The projectile carried 88 M42/M46 grenade-like dual purpose submunitions. The 155 mm M864 projectile entered production in 1987, and featured a base bleed that enhances the range of the projectile, although it still carries the same M42/M46 grenades. The base bleed mechanism reduces the submunition count to 72. Work was budgeted in 2003 to retrofit the M42/M46 grenades with self-destruct fuses to reduce the problem of "dud" submunitions that do not initially explode but may explode thereafter upon handling. In Vietnam they were known as "firecracker rounds" owing to the rippling detonation of submunitions over a couple of seconds.

Work on 105 mm projectiles started in the late 1990s based around the M80 submunition. The eventual results were two shells, the M915 intended for use with the M119A1 light towed howitzer and the M916 developed for the M101/M102 howitzers.

Uses
DPICMs were developed for several reasons:

 They can give a heavy, indirect-fire cannon the ability to engage area targets, with the spread compensating for their inherent inaccuracy;
 DPICM has a potential destructive effect on armored vehicles due to the shaped charge bomblet, but it may require a very large number of shells to have an effect against targets like tank formations to the point of futility;
 Due to their combined spread and airburst, they are more capable against dug-in troops than conventional HE rounds.

Future
As of autumn 2022 the United States will not provide DPICM for defense in the 2022 Russian invasion of Ukraine and will likely avoid using DPICM in most cases.

Large quantities of munitions bought during the Cold War were put into war reserve stockpiles.  However, as of 2014 many were reaching the end of their useful life and required disposal, an expensive process. The warheads, which are now old and less stable, must be extracted. The shells are being refilled with explosives, recycling them for use as inexpensive training ammunition. One such round is the M1122, built from recycled shell casings from DPICM rounds that have some explosive filling replaced with concrete.  As a training round, the M1122 has one-seventh the explosive impact at one-third the cost of a standard M795 high-explosive shell.

The U.S. Army is seeking a replacement of DPICMs from the Alternative Warhead Program (AWP).  The AWP warheads have equal or greater effect against materiel and personnel targets, while leaving no unexploded ordnance behind.  The program is being developed by Lockheed Martin and Alliant Techsystems and the first AW rockets were ordered in September 2015.

References

Artillery ammunition
Cluster munition
Military equipment introduced in the 1960s